Unedogemmula contigua is an extinct species of sea snail, a marine gastropod mollusk in the family Turridae, the turrids.

Description
The length of the shell attains 24 mm.

Distribution
This extinct marine species was found in Miocene strata in Italy, Spain and Turkey; in Pliocene strata in Alpes-Maritimes, France.

References

 Brocchi, John the Baptist. Sub-Apennine fossil shellology with geological observations on the Apennines and on the adjacent soil by G. Brocchi... With sixteen copper plates. Volume one [-second]: 1 . Royal Printing House, 1814.

External links
 Guioli, SIMONA, GIOVANNI Repetto, and FRANCO Gabba. "Marine fossils from the Pliocene of Volpedo (Piedmont, Italy). Collections of the Civic Museum of Natural Sciences of Voghera and the Civic Archaeological Museum of Casteggio and Oltrepo Pavese." Piedmont Review of Natural History 30 (2009): 3-24.
 Tabanelli, Cesare, et al. "The malacofauna of the “spingo”. Note on the genus Parviturbo Pilsbry & McGinty, 1945." Notebook of Studies and News of Natural History of Romagna 49 (2019): 15-32.
 Mony, Stephen. "Analysis of deep mollusc associations in a Pliocene section near Brisighella (Ravenna, Italy)." Study book and news of Natural History of Romagna 22 (2006): 1-38.
 Della Bella, Giano, and Cesare Tabanelli. Review of the Pliocenic fauna of Rio Albonello (Brisighella, Ravenna). IIL Testyleda annaritae n. sp.
 Vera-Peláez, José Luis. "Revisión de la familia Turridae, excepto Clavatulinae (Gastropoda, Prosobranchia) in the Plioceno de las cuencas de Estepona, Malaga y Velez Malaga (Malaga, S Espana) with the description of 26 new species." Pliocenica, Publicaciones del Museo Municipal Paleontológico de Estepona 2 (2002): 176-262.
 Ambrosetti, PIERLUIGI, et al. "The Pliocene and Early Pleistocene of the Tiber River Basin in Southern Umbria." Physical Geography and Quaternary Dynamics 10.1 (1987): 10-33.
 Tabanelli, Cesare. "Associations of bathyal paleocommunities with benthic molluscs in the Pliocene of Romagna." Notebook of Studies and News of Natural History of Romagna 26 (2008): 1-80.

contigua
Gastropods described in 1814